De heretico comburendo (2 Hen.4 c.15) was a law passed by Parliament under King Henry IV of England in 1401, punishing heretics with burning at the stake. This law was one of the strictest religious censorship statutes ever enacted in England.  In March 1401 William Sawtrey became the first Lollard to be burned.

The statute declared there were "divers false and perverse people of a certain new sect ... they make and write books, they do wickedly instruct and inform people ... and commit subversion of the said catholic faith". The sect alluded to is the Lollards, followers of John Wycliffe.

De heretico comburendo urged "that this wicked sect, preachings, doctrines, and opinions, should from henceforth cease and be utterly destroyed", and declared "that all and singular having such books or any writings of such wicked doctrine and opinions, shall really with effect deliver or cause to be delivered all such books and writings to the diocesan of the same place within forty days from the time of the proclamation of this ordinance and statute".

"And if any person ... such books in the form aforesaid do not deliver, then the diocesan of the same place in his diocese such person or persons in this behalf defamed or evidently suspected and every of them may by the authority of the said ordinance and statute cause to be arrested". If they failed to abjure their heretical beliefs, or relapsed after an initial abjuration, they 
would "be burnt, that such punishment may strike fear into the minds of others".

Section 6 of the Act of Supremacy 1558 (1 Eliz.1 c.1) (1559) repealed the statutes but it was not until March 1677 that a bill to take away the Crown's right to the writ was introduced in the House of Commons. It passed in that session.

Meaning and linguistics 
De heretico comburendo is a Latin phrase meaning "Regarding the burning of heretics". See Latin spelling and pronunciation for more information.

History 
Although partial English translations of the Bible had existed for hundreds of years, the Middle English translation published under the direction of John Wycliffe in the 1380s, known as Wycliffe's Bible, was the first complete translation and the first to gain widespread acceptance and use. The Church authorities condemned Wycliffe's translation because they deemed the commentary included with the work to be heretical, and because they feared a vernacular translation of the Bible from the Latin Vulgate, absent appropriate catechesis, would lead the ignorant laity to reject Church authority and fall into heresy.

Wycliffe was the inspiration for what would become the Lollard movement, which was considered heretical by the Church. The Oxford Constitutions, established in 1409 by Archbishop Thomas Arundel, were further punitive measures intended to punish heresy in England that grew in large part out of the De heretico comburendo.

In Hil. 9 Jac. I. the court magistrate considers an inquiry from an attorney and solicitor about whether the writ of De heretico comburendo was sustained upon conviction of heresy before the Ordinary, saying it was not for reasons based on certain authorities, though upon further consultations other magistrates disagree based on Elizabethan era precedents and say that enforcement of the statute De heretico comburendo is not dependent on the aforementioned cited authorities, and the writ is sustained, but suggest that conviction before the High Commissioners was the "most convenient and sure way" to convict a heretic.

The writ was abolished by the Ecclesiastical Jurisdiction Act 1677 in England, and in 1695 in Ireland.

See also 
Britain in the Middle Ages
History of the English Bible
Inquisition
Censorship of the Bible

Notes

References

External links
Extracts of the De heretico comburendo
Annotated text , see (B) on the page
Full text transcribed from Danby Pickering's Statutes at Large.

English laws
1400s in law
1400s in England
Christianity in medieval England
Censorship in Christianity
Acts of the Parliament of England concerning religion
Henry IV of England
1401 in Europe
Christianity and law in the 15th century